Piet Derksen (1913 in Rotterdam – 24 February 1996 in Westerhoven) was a Dutch businessman who founded Center Parcs. A devout Catholic, he was also a philanthropist donating all his fortune to various causes.

Company
His father thought he was reading too much, so he said to his son that he should go and play tennis. Pieter listened to the advice of his father, but he generally saw the economical aspect of tennis. He borrowed money from his family and built a tennis court near Kralingen with it.

Later on, Pieter had the idea to sell his tennis court and start a sport store "Sporthuis-centrum" or translated to English "Sporthouse-centre". He bought a tent factory in North Brabant. Due to the increase of economical welfare the public's demand for bigger and better tents was increasing. Pieter came to the idea to rent full accommodated tents on a piece of land near Reuver. This was a great success, so the tents were rapidly replaced by bungalows. In 1978 Pieter decided to sell his sports store concern. He did this so he could fully concentrate himself on the company "Sporthuis Centrum".[2] He even built a house for himself on park "De Kempervennen" near Eindhoven. He did this because he believed it was better to see your company work, and also to stay closer to your customers

References

1913 births
1996 deaths
Businesspeople from Rotterdam
Center Parcs
Dutch traditionalist Catholics